Erath may refer to:

Places 
Erath County, Texas, named after George Bernard Erath
Erath, Louisiana, a town in Vermilion Parish
Erath, a hamlet in Ladakh, India

People 
George Bernard Erath (1813–1891), politician from Texas
Johannes Erath (born 1975), German opera director

See also